The 1910 Oregon Webfoots football team represented the University of Oregon in the 1910 college football season. It was the Webfoots' seventeenth season, they competed as an independent and were led by head coach Bill Warner.

Oregon did not meet Washington or Washington State this season and finished with four wins and one loss (4–1).

Schedule

Schedule sources:

References

Oregon
Oregon Ducks football seasons
Oregon Webfoots football